"Counting Every Minute" is a pop-dance song written by Stock Aitken Waterman for Sonia's debut studio album Everybody Knows (1990). Released in late March 1990 as the album's fourth single, it reached number 16 in United Kingdom, thus providing Sonia's fourth top 20 single from a same album, which made the singer the first female UK artist to achieve this feat.

Chart performance
"Counting Every Minute" entered the UK Singles Chart at number 41 on 7 May 1990, climbed the following three weeks until reaching number 16, then dropped and charted for a total of seven weeks. In Ireland, it ranked from 11 April 1990 and for four weeks, with a peak at number 18. On the Eurochart Hot 100, it started at number 98 on 14 April 1990, reached a peak of number 41 three weeks later and fell off the top 100 after six weeks of presence. It also appeared for two weeks on the European Airplay Top 50, with a peak at number 36 on 12 May.

Formats and track listings
CD single
 "Counting Every Minute" - 3:32
 "Counting Every Minute" (The Don Miguel Mix) - 6:45
 "You'll Never Stop Me Loving You" (Sonia's Kiss Mix) - 6:40
7" single, Cassette single
 "Counting Every Minute" - 3:32
 "Counting Every Minute" (Instrumental) - 3:56
12" single
 "Counting Every Minute" (The Don Miguel Mix) - 6:45
 "You'll Never Stop Me Loving You" (Sonia's Kiss Mix) - 6:40
 "Counting Every Minute" - 3:32
12" remix
 "Counting Every Minute" (Tick-Tock Mix) - 7:25
 "Counting Every Minute" (The Don Miguel Mix) - 6:45
 "You'll Never Stop Me Loving You" (Sonia's Kiss Mix) - 6:40

Credits and presonnel
The following people contributed to "Counting Every Minute":
Sonia - lead vocals 
Mae McKenna, Miriam Stockley - backing vocals 
Mike Stock - keyboards, baking vocals
Matt Aitken - guitars, keyboards
A Linn - drums
Dave Ford - mixing

Charts

References

1989 songs
1990 singles
Sonia (singer) songs
Song recordings produced by Stock Aitken Waterman
Songs written by Mike Stock (musician)
Songs written by Matt Aitken
Songs written by Pete Waterman
Chrysalis Records singles